"No Excuses" is the lead single from American rock band Alice in Chains' third EP, Jar of Flies (1994). Written by guitarist and co-lead vocalist Jerry Cantrell, the song was well received by music critics and was a charting success, becoming the first Alice in Chains song to reach No. 1 on Billboard's Mainstream Rock Tracks chart, spending a total of 26 weeks on the chart. It has gone on to become one of the band's most popular songs. The song was included on the compilation albums Nothing Safe: Best of the Box (1999), Music Bank (1999), Greatest Hits (2001), and The Essential Alice in Chains (2006). Alice In Chains performed an acoustic version of "No Excuses" for its appearance on MTV Unplugged in 1996, which marked the last time they performed the song with Layne Staley, and that version was included on the  band's Unplugged live album and home video release.

Musical content

Composition
The song's sound (and that of the entire EP) is a departure from some of the band's better-known, heavier work. Guitarist Jerry Cantrell's subtle guitar riffs built around suspended chords (as well as drummer Sean Kinney's soft, syncopated drumming) help lend an unusually airy feel to the song.

"No Excuses" is based around a jangly A-to-B major barre chord change, with the open B and E strings ringing out.

Musical style 
"No Excuses" use of open, ringing strings has been compared to the style of American rock band R.E.M., while Guitar Player wrote that Kinney's "crisp, splashy" drum grooves could "turn The Police's Stewart Copeland's head".

Lyrics
The lyrics, penned by Cantrell, are thought to be about his unstable relationship with band vocalist Layne Staley, highlighting both their difficulties as well as their friendship. The final verse seems to come to a resolve in stating that Cantrell will "defend" Staley and that, should they grow further apart, he will "love (Staley) anyway."

Release and reception
"No Excuses" was released as a single in 1994. The song found moderate airplay on alternative rock radio and is considered by music fans and critics as a grunge staple. "No Excuses" peaked at number 48 on the Billboard Hot 100 Airplay chart, making it the only Alice in Chains to reach the top 50. Although Alice in Chains fared well on mainstream rock radio, "No Excuses" was their only song to hit number one on the Billboard Mainstream Rock Tracks chart until "Check My Brain" in 2009. "No Excuses" also peaked at number three on the Billboard Modern Rock Tracks chart and number 32 on the Pop Songs chart. In Canada, it rose to number 17 on the RPM Top Singles chart and was the 98th most successful hit of 1994.

Ned Raggett of AllMusic said that the song "proved in spades that Alice in Chains were far more than oppressive doom-mongers" and added, "Topped off with a catchy chorus, it made for another high point for a band seemingly blessed with them."

Music video
The music video for "No Excuses" was released in 1994 and was directed by Matt Mahurin, who had previously directed the "Angry Chair" music video for the band. Layne Staley and Jerry Cantrell are the only band members to be featured on the video. It also features actor Max Perlich. The video is available on the home video release Music Bank: The Videos.

Live performances
Alice in Chains performed the song for the first time at the Hollywood Palladium during a benefit concert for Norwood Fisher of Fishbone on January 7, 1994.

The band performed an acoustic version of "No Excuses" for its appearance on MTV Unplugged in 1996, and the song was included on the Unplugged live album and home video release. This was the last time the band performed the song with Staley.

In popular culture
"No Excuses" was chosen as a playable track on the popular video game Guitar Hero: Metallica and was also released as downloadable content for the Rock Band series.

"No Excuses" was also featured in the season 5 Daria episode "My Night at Daria's" during the first commercial bumper.

The song was released as downloadable content for the music video game Rocksmith on December 12, 2017, as part of Alice In Chains Song Pack II, which also includes the songs "Rooster", "Nutshell", "Down in a Hole", and "Heaven Beside You".

Track listing

Personnel
Layne Staley – co-lead vocals
Jerry Cantrell – co-lead vocals, guitars
Mike Inez – bass
Sean Kinney – drums, percussion

Charts

Weekly charts

Year-end charts

Certifications

References

External links

Accolades archived at Acclaimed Music

1994 singles
Alice in Chains songs
Songs written by Jerry Cantrell
Songs about friendship
1994 songs
Columbia Records singles
Jangle pop songs